Adnan (popularly known as Master Adnan) is a Bangladeshi film actor. He won Bangladesh National Film Award for Best Child Artist for the film Megher Onek Rong (1976). Adnan was the first awardee of best child artist category in 1976.

Selected films
 Megher Onek Rong (1976)

Awards and nominations
National Film Awards

References

External links

Bangladeshi film actors
Best Child Artist National Film Award (Bangladesh) winners
Living people
Year of birth missing (living people)